Salcedo is the capital city of the Hermanas Mirabal Province in the Dominican Republic. It is the birthplace of the Dominican heroines, the Mirabal sisters, who died in the struggle against the dictator Rafael Trujillo.  A museum in the town commemorates three of sisters; it was tended to by the remaining sister, Bélgica (Dedé) Mirabal, until her death on February 1, 2014.

The city is named after Francisco Antonio Salcedo who fought in the northwestern part of the country against the Haitian army during the Dominican-Haitian War after the Dominican independence from Haiti in 1844.

Geography 
Salcedo is located in the Cibao Valley, south of the Cordillera Septentrional (in English, "Northern mountain range"). It has a total area of 432.95 km2. It has only one municipal district (a subdivision of a municipality): Jamao Afuera.

Climate

History 
In the place where is now the city of Salcedo there was a very small town with the name of Juana Núñez. It was made a Puesto cantonal (an old category that now is called Municipal District) in 1880 as part of the old La Vega province.

With the creation of the Espaillat province in 1885, Juana Núñez was made part of this new province. In 1891, its name was changed from Juana Núñez to the present one, Salcedo.

Salcedo was made a municipality in 1905 and, when the Salcedo Province (now Hermanas Mirabal Province) was created in 1952, the city became the head municipality of the new province.

Economy
Farming is the only economic activity in the municipality, except for some very small industries; the main products are plantain, cassava and cacao.

Sister cities
  Atlanta, Georgia, United States

Interesting facts
The city became widely known outside of the Dominican Republic due to the YouTube video with an unusual request from the listener of a local radio station to play a song with the words "Esas son Reebok o son Nike" (meaning "Are they Reebok or Nike?"). The song in reference was actually Corona's "The Rhythm of the Night".

References

Populated places in Hermanas Mirabal Province
Municipalities of the Dominican Republic